INO is a visual artist from Greece who studied painting at the Athens School of Fine Arts and is worldwide known for his large scale murals.

Notable works
Apocalypse Now 2020 - Athens, Greece 
 Straat Museum - Amsterdam, Holland 
 INO's 90 meter mural for Leonardo da Vinci exhibition - 500 Years of Genius 
 St. Pauli Millerntor-Stadion central wall - Hamburg, Germany 
 Urban Nation Museum - Berlin, Germany 
 Park Inn Hotel - Yas Island, Abu Dhabi, UAE 
 FCB Offices - Manhattan, New York, USA 
 Cyprus Parliament building Mural - Nicosia, Cyprus 
 Katara Cultural Village - Doha, Qatar 
 The Coca-Cola Company Offices (Central & Southern Europe) 
 National Geographic mural for PBS - Piraeus Port, Greece 
 "Avicii - The Days" Painting & performance in the lyric video clip made in Stockholm, Sweden 
 Onassis Cultural Center - Athens, Greece 
 Story Nightclub for the Art Basel - Miami Beach, USA 
 INO in The New York Times

References

External links 

 Official website: 

Anonymous artists
Street artists
Guerilla artists
Public art
Greek graffiti artists
Greek contemporary artists
Greek painters
Living people
Year of birth missing (living people)